Herbert William Emmitt (6 August 1857 – 1901) was an English footballer who played in The Football League for Notts County. He also played cricket for Nottinghamshire, making two first-class appearances in 1884. He also made a single first-class appearance for the North in 1888.

References

1867 births
1901 deaths
English footballers
Association football forwards
Notts County F.C. players
Nottingham Forest F.C. players
English Football League players
English cricketers
Nottinghamshire cricketers
North v South cricketers
Association football midfielders